"Other 99" is a song by English band Big Audio Dynamite, released as both a 7" and 12" single from their third studio album, Tighten Up Vol. 88 (1988). Written by Mick Jones and Don Letts, and following the moderate success of "Just Play Music!", "Other 99" was released as the second and final single from the album, peaking at No. 81 on the UK Singles Chart, and No. 13 on Billboard's Modern Rock Tracks chart. The single features the non-album track, "What Happened to Eddie?" as its B-side, which remains exclusive to the single.

Track listing
7" single
"Other 99"
"What Happened to Eddie?"

12" single and CD single
"Other 99 (Extended Mix)"
"Just Play Music! (Club Mix)"
Mixed by Greg Roberts
"What Happened to Eddie?"

Chart performance

References

External links
 

1988 songs
1988 singles
Big Audio Dynamite songs
Songs written by Mick Jones (The Clash)
Song recordings produced by Mick Jones (The Clash)
CBS Records singles
Songs written by Don Letts